Probable ATP-dependent RNA helicase DDX5 also known as DEAD box protein 5 or RNA helicase p68 is an enzyme that in humans is encoded by the DDX5 gene.

Function 

DEAD box proteins, characterized by the conserved motif Asp-Glu-Ala-Asp (DEAD), are putative RNA helicases. They are implicated in a number of cellular processes involving alteration of RNA secondary structure, such as translation initiation, nuclear and mitochondrial splicing, and ribosome and spliceosome assembly. Based on their distribution patterns, some members of this family are believed to be involved in embryogenesis, spermatogenesis, and cellular growth and division. This gene encodes a DEAD box protein, which is an RNA-dependent ATPase, and also a proliferation-associated nuclear antigen, specifically reacting with the simian virus 40 tumor antigen. This gene consists of 13 exons, and alternatively spliced transcripts containing several intron sequences have been detected, but no isoforms encoded by these transcripts have been identified.

Interactions
DDX5 has been shown to interact with:
 AKAP8,
  DDX17 (p72),
 DHX9 (RNA helicase A),
 Estrogen receptor alpha,
 Fibrillarin,
 HDAC1,
 Nuclear receptor coactivator 1,
 Nuclear receptor coactivator 2,
 Nuclear receptor coactivator 3,
 p53,
 CTCF.

References

Further reading

EC 3.6.4